Koszewo  is a village in the administrative district of Gmina Stargard, within Stargard County, West Pomeranian Voivodeship, in north-western Poland. The village has a population of 438.

See also 

 History of Pomerania

References

Koszewo